Daniel ("Danny") Wilhelmus Maria Nelissen (born 10 November 1970 in Sittard, Netherlands) is a Dutch former professional road bicycle racer and former sports commentator at Eurosport. He won the 1995 amateur world championship and was named Dutch Sportsman of the year. He was the nephew of cycling commentator Jean Nelissen.

He started his professional career in 1990 with PDM, for which he won his first professional race, the Grand Prix de Wallonie, in 1992. In 1994, while riding for the Dutch TVM team, he developed heart rhythm impairments and returned to ride at amateur level.

The following year in Colombia he won the amateur world championship. He was the last amateur world champion, the UCI replacing the race with a youth competition in 1996. The triumph lead to Nelissen being voted as 1995 Dutch Sportsman of the year. According to Nelissen, his use of a power meter was key to his win: he claimed that he was one of the few riders "(who) had them and knew what they could do" at that time, alongside Greg LeMond and Jonathan Vaughters. All three riders shared the same coach, Adrie Van Diemen. He prepared for the race by tackling the hardest climb on the finishing circuit in a variety of ways to find the tactic which would enable him to complete the climb fastest, settling on riding it at a steady tempo. During the race he was able to use this tactic to catch up to the other riders in the winning break after being dropped by them at the start of the climb. He made his winning break just over a lap from the finish, attacking on a descent and soloing to the finish.

He was brought into the Rabobank team for two years under manager Jan Raas. In the 1996 Tour de France, he wore the polka dot jersey as leader of the mountains classification for a couple of days. Before 1998, he joined the Danish team, Team Home – Jack & Jones (later named Team CSC).

In January 1999, further heart problems brought his retirement at 28.

He is currently the production manager of Dutch Eurosport.

Danny Nelissen was the first Dutch road bicycle racer to admit the use of doping during the years 1996 and 1997. He repeated his confession on Dutch television (RTL7, interview by Wilfred Genee, 21 Jan. 2013).

Major results

1988
 1st  Overall Giro di Basilicata
1990
 1st Prologue Olympia's Tour
1991
 5th Grand Prix d'Isbergues
1992
 1st Grand Prix de Wallonie
 1st Omloop Mandel-Leie-Schelde
 1st Stage 6 Vuelta a Aragón
 2nd Overall Étoile de Bessèges
 3rd Overall Euskal Bizikleta
1st Stage 4
 8th Cholet-Pays de Loire
1993
 1st Profronde van Heerlen
 1st Stage 4 Vuelta Asturias
 3rd Veenendaal–Veenendaal
 4th Overall Tour de Luxembourg
1994
 3rd Kampioenschap van Vlaanderen
 3rd GP Stad Zottegem
1995
 1st  Amateur road race, UCI Road World Championships
 1st  Overall Olympia's Tour
1st Stages 8b & 9
 1st Stage 3 Tour de Wallonie
 2nd Road race, National Road Championships
1996
 1st Drielandenomloop
 2nd Time trial, National Road Championships
 3rd Overall Teleflex Tour
 7th Overall Vuelta a Murcia
1998
 1st Schaal Sels
 3rd Overall Hessen Rundfahrt
1st Stage 3
 5th Grote Prijs Jef Scherens

Grand Tour general classification results timeline

See also
 List of Dutch Olympic cyclists

External links
Official site

References

1970 births
Living people
Cycling announcers
Doping cases in cycling
Dutch sportspeople in doping cases
Cyclists at the 1996 Summer Olympics
Dutch male cyclists
Olympic cyclists of the Netherlands
People from Sittard
UCI Road World Championships cyclists for the Netherlands
Cyclists from Limburg (Netherlands)